Clareabbey is a civil parish in County Clare, Ireland, named after the former Augustinian monastery of Clare Abbey.
The main settlement in the town of Clarecastle.

Location

Clareabbey lies in the barony of Islands.
The parish lies on the River Fergus, on the road from Ennis to Limerick.
The parish in 1637 covered , mostly used for pasturage.
The Fergus bisects the parish, and is bridged at Clare.
The land is generally very fertile, part alluvial and part limestone.

The parish contains the townlands of  Ballaghafadda (East), Ballaghafadda (West), Ballybeg, Ballyveskil, Ballyvonnavaun, Barntick, Buncraggy, Carrowgar, Carrownanelly, Clareabbey, Clare Commons, Clarehill, Creggaunnahilla, Derreen, Feagh, Islandavanna Lower (Intake), Islandavanna Upper (Intake), Islandmagrath, Killow, Knockanimana, Lissan East, Lissan West, Manusmore and Skehanagh.

History

The parish was the seat of the Augustinian Clare Abbey, which Donald O’Brien, King of Limerick, founded in 1195.
After the suppression of the monastery in 1543 the parish lands were given to the barons of Ibrackan by King Henry VIII of England.
In 1620 it became the property of the Earl of Thomond.
According to Thomas Moland, writing in 1703,

A Protestant church with a square tower was erected in 1813.
As of 1837 two fairs were still held at Clare each year.
There were 3,280 inhabitants in 1841 in 516 houses, almost all Catholics.
The parish was part of the Catholic district of Clare, which also contained the parish of Killone. Each parish had a chapel.

References
Citations

Sources

Civil parishes of County Clare